Cyana klausruedigerbecki is a moth of the family Erebidae. It was described by Timm Karisch in 2005. It is found in Burkina Faso.

References

Cyana
Moths described in 2005